Giuseppe Vela Júnior ‘’Giu Vela’’’ (born 28 September 1977) is a Brazilian football Player  who played professionally in the Greek Superleague. Now official Agent Manager Intermediary , Greek Federation Football EPO, HFF, Uefa, Fifa.

Career
Vela began playing football in Brazil with Coritiba FC as a professional , he went to Blumenau Esporte Clube and Associação Ferroviária de Esportes. He moved to Greece in July 2003, initially joining Greek second division side Apollon Kalamarias F.C. on a two-year contract. Vela helped the club gain promotion to the Greek Superleague in his first season, and he would appear in 57 league matches the following season. He signed with fellow Superleague club Larissa F.C. 28 league matches the following season, but immediately returned to Apollon Kalamarias where he would play for another two seasons 41 league matches in the Superleague.

In August 2008, Vela joined Greek division side Veria F.C. on a six-month contract. At the end of 2008, ne moved back to Brazil to play for Mogi Mirim Esporte Clube A league Paulista.

In August 2009, Vela returned to Greece, joining second division side Anagennisi Karditsa on a one-year contract. He extended his stay for another year in August 2011. In 2012 he played in Malta Premier League Qormi. Now official Agent Intermediary Football players , Greek Federation Football.

References

https://plus.google.com/116771996815957216636
http://www.metrosport.gr/article/o-vrazilianos-apo-ti-napoli-pou-egine-ellinas
https://plus.google.com/116771996815957216636

1977 births
Living people
Brazilian footballers
Brazilian expatriate footballers
Associação Ferroviária de Esportes players
Mogi Mirim Esporte Clube players
Apollon Pontou FC players
Athlitiki Enosi Larissa F.C. players
Veria F.C. players
Anagennisi Karditsa F.C. players
Super League Greece players
Qormi F.C. players
Association football midfielders
Footballers from Curitiba